Troja railway station opened in 1896, closed in 1975,  reopened in 1977 and closed for good in 1978. It was on the Bog Walk to Port Antonio branch line,  from the Kingston terminus (in Jamaica), and served the surrounding agricultural community, providing a means for bananas to reach and be exported from Port Antonio. It was vandalised some time after closure.

Architecture
The station was a two-story wooden building with sash windows, the upper floor being smaller than the lower and centrally placed. The pitched roof over the ground floor was extended to form a canopy over the platform on all four sides of the building. The upper story had a gable end roof.

Track layout
In addition to the platform serving the through line there was a second platform on the opposite side of the station building on a passing loop and, most likely, freight sidings as well.

Fares
In 1910 the third class fare from Troja to Kingston was 2/6 (two shillings and sixpence); first class was about double.

See also
Railways of Jamaica
Railway stations in Jamaica

References

Bibliography

External links
Aerial view.
Stamp cancellations.

Railway stations in Jamaica
Buildings and structures in Saint Catherine Parish
Railway stations opened in 1896
Railway stations closed in 1978